Onomastics (or, in older texts, onomatology) is the study of the etymology, history, and use of proper names. An orthonym is the proper name of the object in question, the object of onomastic study.

Onomastics can be helpful in data mining, with applications such as named-entity recognition, or recognition of the origin of names. It is a popular approach in historical research, where it can be used to identify ethnic minorities within wider populations and for the purpose of prosopography.

Etymology
Onomastics originates from the Greek onomastikós, itself derived from ónoma.

Branches 

 Toponymy (or toponomastics), one of the principal branches of onomastics, is the study of place names.
 Anthroponomastics is the study of personal names.

 Literary onomastics is the branch that researches the names in works of literature and other fiction.
 Socio-onomastics or Re-Onomastics is the study of names within a society or culture.

See also
 Ancient Greek personal names
 Extinction of surnames
 Hydronym
 Mononymous persons
 Naming convention
 -onym, listing the technical kinds of names

 Organizations
 American Name Society
 English Place-Name Society
 Guild of One-Name Studies
 International Council of Onomastic Sciences
 Society for Name Studies in Britain and Ireland
 UNGEGN Toponymic Guidelines
 United Nations Group of Experts on Geographical Names

References

External links

 
 Lexicon of Greek Personal Names, a Major Research Project of the British Academy, Oxford, contains over 35,000 published Greek names.

 
Folklore
Lexicography